Drowning World (2003) is a science fiction novel by American writer  Alan Dean Foster.

Plot summary
On the distant planet Fluva, torrential rains that leave it barely habitable also make it a treasure trove of rare botanical specimens. When the human bio-prospector Shadrach Hasselemoga crashes in the remote and deadliest place on Fluva; the Viisiiviisii. The only crew available to search for him is the warrior Jemunu-jah, one of the native Sakuntala, and the immigrant Deyzara trader and experienced pilot, Masurathoo. This culturally different and physically repulsive to each other couple promptly crash also. While the rescuers and the rescued are all slogging it out of the ultimate rain forest, the reptilian AAnn empire is fomenting bloody trouble between the Sakuntula and the Deyzara. This leaves Commonwealth administrator Lauren Matthias in the hot seat, with refugees swarming in to her limited facilities and the bodies of the innocent piling up, with few resources to help. But it's the survivors of the rain forest who bring new knowledge that helps save Fluva, along with quick work by Matthias.

Literary significance and reception
Regina Schroeder in her review for Booklist said "Driven by political intrigue and wilderness adventure, this is SF of noble vintage."  Kirkus Reviews summarized this novel as "a Cold War-style superpower confrontation-by-proxy, tricked out in weird-alien garb: no prizes for style, but satisfyingly substantial."  Peter Cannon gave this book a mixed review in Publishers Weekly saying "the human characters are notably less developed than the aliens, and the AAn Empire is something of a straw foe these days, but the author's mastery of his exotic setting cannot be denied."

References

External links

Alan Dean Foster homepage

2003 American novels
2003 science fiction novels
American science fiction novels
Humanx Commonwealth
Novels by Alan Dean Foster
Del Rey books